The Buolkalakh (Buolkalax) is a river in Yakutia (Sakha Republic), Russia.

It is a lowland river with its mouth very close to the Olenyok delta. It flows north of the Arctic Circle across a lonely, desolate tundra area devoid of settlements.

Course  
The Buolkalakh is a left tributary of the Olenyok. It has its origin in a swampy area full of lakes, just a little north of the sources of the Udya and the Bur. It flows roughly northwestwards, meandering along its course. After the confluence of the Khaastaakh it flows roughly northwards, skirting a low ridge. The confluence is a little upstream from the village of Ust-Olenyok. 

The river is fed by snow and rain. It is frozen between early October and early June. The river basin is mostly in Olenyoksky District, with the upper course section of the Khaastaakh in Bulunsky District.

See also
List of rivers of Russia

References

External links 
Fishing & Tourism in Yakutia

Rivers of the Sakha Republic
North Siberian Lowland
Tributaries of the Olenyok